Samoa Airways, formerly Polynesian Airlines, is the state-owned flag carrier airline of Samoa.

The airline was founded in 1959 as "Polynesian Airlines", providing domestic and international flights throughout the South Pacific. International operations were temporarily halted in 2005 and taken over by new airline Polynesian Blue (later Virgin Samoa), before resuming international flights under the new name of "Samoa Airways" in late 2017.

Samoa Airways is wholly owned by the government of Samoa and is based in the capital city of Apia, with its headquarters located in the Samoa National Provident Fund Building on Beach Road and its primary hub at Faleolo International Airport. The airline presently operates short-haul flights within Samoa and American Samoa, however it no longer serves long-haul flights to Australia and New Zealand.

History 

The airline was established in 1959 as "Polynesian Airlines", and started operations in August that year. By 1969 it was running daily flights to Pago Pago using a Douglas DC-3, as well as services to Tonga and Fiji using a chartered Hawker Siddeley HS 748.

In 2005, the airline's international jet flights were taken over by Polynesian Blue, a new airline established as a joint venture between the government of Samoa and Australian low-cost carrier Virgin Blue. Both the Samoan government and Virgin Blue each held 49% ownership of the new airline with the remaining 2% held by a Samoan investment group. The government of Samoa cited rising operating costs for Polynesian Airlines, which accounted for more than half of the government's annual budget, as one of the main reasons for suspending its international operations. However, Polynesian Airlines continued to operate turboprop flights in Samoa and American Samoa. In 2011, Virgin Blue announced a rebranding of its airline group, with its Samoan subsidiary being renamed "Virgin Samoa".

In 2017, the Samoan government announced that it was closing down Virgin Samoa, citing a lack of competitive fare pricing and disappointing performance. In its place, Polynesian Airlines would resume international flights with the new name of "Samoa Airways". The state-owned Samoa Airways partnered with Fiji Airways to assist with international flight operations, and wet-leased a Boeing 737-800 from Italian airline Neos in a deal brokered by Icelandair. International flights recommenced on 14 November 2017, with Samoa Airways flying from Apia to Auckland.

Destinations
As of October 2020, Samoa Airways operates to the following destinations (including former destinations):

Fleet
The Samoa Airways fleet comprises the following aircraft as of August 2021:

A Boeing 737 MAX 9 was ordered and was to be delivered in April 2019, however the order was cancelled in the wake of the March 2019 worldwide Boeing 737 MAX groundings.

Previously operated
As Polynesian Airlines, the airline previously operated the following aircraft:

Accidents and incidents
On 11 May 1966 at around 18:10 local time, the three crew members operating a Polynesian Airlines Douglas DC-3 with the registration 5W-FAB on training flight lost control of the aircraft over the Apolima Strait after the cabin entry door detached and hit the tail. The aircraft was on a training flight, the three crew members were the only people on board; all three were killed in the subsequent crash.
On 13 January 1970 at 02:54 local time, Polynesian Airlines Flight 208B, which was operated by a Douglas DC-3D (registered 5W-FAC), crashed into the sea shortly after take-off from Faleolo International Airport on an international non-scheduled passenger flight to Pago Pago International Airport, American Samoa, killing the 29 passengers and three crew on board.
On 20 August 1988, a Polynesian Airlines Britten-Norman BN-2A Islander (registered 5W-FAF) was damaged beyond repair when it overshot the runway upon landing at Asau Airport; there were no fatalities.
On 13 September 1994, a Polynesian Airlines Boeing 737-3Q8 operating Flight PH844 from Fuaʻamotu International Airport to Faleolo International Airport discovered the body of a deceased male stowaway was jamming the starboard carriageway. At 6:00, after 3.5 hours of maneuvers attempting to dislodge the body, the flight made an emergency landing at Faleolo using only the nosewheel and port undercarriage. All 72 occupants survived with minimal damage to the aircraft. Eyewitness and author Ruperake Petaia wrote The Miracle based on a number of passenger accounts of the event.
On 7 January 1997 at around 11:00 local time, a Polynesian Airlines de Havilland Canada DHC-6-300 Twin Otter crashed into Mount Vaea in Samoa during bad weather conditions, a so-called controlled flight into terrain. The aircraft had been operating Flight 211 from Pago Pago to Apia, when the pilots decided to divert to Faleolo Airport. In the crash, two of three passengers and one of the two pilots lost their lives.

References

External links

Samoa Airways
Information about Polynesian Airlines

 

Airlines of Samoa
Airlines established in 1959
1959 establishments in Oceania
Government-owned companies of Samoa